Jan Micka (born 15 January 1995 in Prague) is a Czech swimmer, who specialized in long-distance freestyle events. He is a two-time Czech record holder in the 800 and 1500 m freestyle. Micka is a member of the swimming team for USK Praha, and is coached and trained by Jaroslava Passerova.

Micka qualified for the men's 1500 m freestyle, as Czech Republic's youngest swimmer (aged 17), at the 2012 Summer Olympics in London, by eclipsing a FINA B-standard entry time of 15:28.49 from the European Junior Championships in Antwerp, Belgium. He challenged six other swimmers on the first heat, including two-time Olympian Ediz Yıldırımer of Turkey. Micka edged out Iceland's Anton Sveinn McKee to take a second spot by six hundredths of a second (0.06) in 15:29.34. Micka failed to advance into the final, as he placed twenty-fourth overall in the preliminaries.

References

External links
NBC Olympics Profile

1995 births
Living people
Czech male freestyle swimmers
Olympic swimmers of the Czech Republic
Swimmers at the 2012 Summer Olympics
Swimmers at the 2016 Summer Olympics
Sportspeople from Prague
Swimmers at the 2020 Summer Olympics